The Royal Order of the Yugoslav Crown was instituted by King Alexander I of Yugoslavia on 5 April 1930, to commemorate his changing of the name of the Kingdom of the Serbs, Croats and Slovenes to the Kingdom of Yugoslavia.

It continues as a dynastic order, with appointments currently made by Alexander, Crown Prince of Yugoslavia.

History
King Alexander ascended the Throne in 1921. During a political crisis in 1929 the strong separatist movements within the country forced the King to temporarily suspend the Constitution to declare a dictatorship and to place greater emphasis on national unity, which resulted in the name of the country to Yugoslavia. The order was awarded to Yugoslavian citizens who enhanced national unity or for merit towards the Crown or State in public service, as well as to the foreign nationals who had assisted the country. The Order of the Yugoslav Crown was senior to Order of St. Sava.

Description
Insignia of the Order were made by the French firm Artis Bertrand and Swiss firm Huguenin.  The Order of Yugoslav Crown five degrees' insignia are suspended from a ribbon of dark blue moire.  The center of the cross contains the image of the Yugoslav royal crown and is part of the decoration of all degrees of the order. On the reverse side of the insignia is engraved the date "3-X-1929 and the royal monogram "A" (for 3 October 1929 and Alexander). The First and Second classes of the order also wear the star of the Order on the left side of his chest. The third, fourth, and fifth classes only wear the insignia of the Order. The First class of the order is worn on a blue moire riband over his right shoulder. The Second and Third class of the Order worn on a blue moire neck ribbon. The Fourth and Fifth class of the Order worn on a triangular blue moire ribbon on the left breast.

Recipients
Prince Tomislav of Yugoslavia
Prince Paul of Yugoslavia
Alexander, Crown Prince of Yugoslavia
Peter II of Yugoslavia
Prince Alexander of Yugoslavia
Petar Bojović (1930)
Prince Andrew of Yugoslavia
Viktor Alexander
Artur Phleps in Romanian Army (1933)
Walther von Brauchitsch before World War II (1939)
Fedor von Bock before World War II (1939)
Louis Cukela (1888–1956)
Dominik Mandić
Milutin Milanković
Sepp Janko
Stewart Menzies
Geoffrey Fisher

References

 
Yugoslav Crown, Order of the
The Yugoslav Crown, Order of the
Awards established in 1930
Awards disestablished in 1945
1930 establishments in Yugoslavia